The Rwandan national cricket team is the team that represents Rwanda in international cricket. They became an affiliate member of the International Cricket Council (ICC) in 2003 and an associate member in 2017.

History

2000-2008

2004 marked the genesis of Rwanda national team's participation in Regional & International tournaments, their very first being the African Affiliates Championship in 2004, where they finished seventh in South Africa. In 2006 they competed in Division Three of the African region of the World Cricket League, improving their performance and finishing in sixth. They remained in Division Three in 2008.

In 2008, they participated in the ICC World Cricket League Africa Region Division Three hosted by South Africa and reached semi finals.

2009-2015

In 2009, the national team participated in the African Cricket World Cup qualifiers in Malawi and in the ICC Africa Twenty20 Division Three in 2011 hosted by Ghana and emerged as the winners against Seychelles.

2015-2020

In 2016, captain Eric Dusingizimana set a world record for the longest individual net session in an attempt to raise funds for the construction of a new cricket stadium.

In 2017, they became an associate member of the ICC.

In April 2018, the ICC decided to grant full Twenty20 International (T20I) status to all its members. Therefore, all Twenty20 matches played between Rwanda and other ICC members since 1 January 2019 have been full T20Is.

In March 2018 the Rwanda Cricket Association named former Kenyan international Martin Suji as head coach on an initial four-month contract, encompassing the 2018–19 ICC World Twenty20 Africa Qualifier Eastern Subregion tournament.

Grounds
Gahanga International Cricket Stadium and Kicukiro Oval located in IPRC Kigali former ETO Kicukiro are the main cricket grounds in Kigali. In August 2011, Rwanda Cricket Stadium Foundation was formed to build and manage, on a not-for-profit basis, the first dedicated international cricket ground in Rwanda. It is located on a 4.5-hectare site on the edge of Kigali, Rwanda's capital.

The charity is run by a team of cricket enthusiasts from the UK Christopher Shale and Rwanda in partnership with the Marylebone Cricket Club Foundation. The ground was expected to be completed in 2014.

The construction of Rwanda's first dedicated cricket ground will provide a permanent home for the sport, helping its development and increasing opportunity for thousands of disadvantaged young people.

In 2012, Brian Lara agreed to become one of the patrons. The stadium is also supported by British Prime Minister David Cameron, Andrew Mitchell, Jonathan Agnew, Heather Knight, Peter Gummer, Baron Chadlington

Facilities 

 An international-standard cricket ground (one Astroturf wicket; several grass wickets)
 Pavilion (with restaurant, bar and conference facilities)
 Six cricket nets
 Modest spectator seating
 Car parking (c. 80 spaces)
 Soft (green) landscaping

Current squad

This lists all the players who have played for Germany in the past 12 months or has been part of the latest T20I squad. Updated as of 6 November 2022.

Records and Statistics 

International Match Summary — Rwanda
 
Last updated 23 December 2022

Twenty20 International 

 Highest team total: 196/4 v. Seychelles, 19 October 2021 at Gahanga International Cricket Stadium, Rwanda. 
 Highest individual score: 100*, Orchide Tuyisenge v. Seychelles, 19 October 2021 at Gahanga International Cricket Stadium, Kigali. 
 Best individual bowling figures: 4/9, Martin Akayezu v. Estawini, 22 October 2021 at Gahanga International Cricket Stadium, Kigali. 

Most T20I runs for Rwanda

Most T20I wickets for Rwanda

T20I record versus other nations

Records complete to T20I #1982. Last updated 23 December 2022.

Other matches
For a list of selected international matches played by Rwanda, see Cricket Archive.

See also
 List of Rwanda Twenty20 International cricketers

References

External links
 Cricinfo-Rwanda

 Rwanda Cricket Stadium Foundation
 Rwanda national cricket team image

Cricket in Rwanda
National cricket teams
Cricket
Rwanda in international cricket